Fanntasy is the first album by Fann Wong (Chinese: 范文芳), released on 6 October 1996.

Track listing
无欲无求
别让情两难(与张信哲合唱)
心事
每个梦
假戏真作
星光
到底要不要爱情
爱曾经来过
吹散为你留下的梦
别让情两难 (Karaoke version)

Recording and production 
The album costs $240,000 to produce and market. Production of the album took six months.

Commercial performance 
10,000 copies were produced and were almost sold out after two weeks from its release. A second issue was done.

References 

Fann Wong albums
1996 debut albums